Donald P. Moynihan is an Irish-American political scientist. He is the McCourt Chair at the McCourt School of Public Policy at Georgetown University, having previously worked at the University of Wisconsin–Madison (UW–Madison) and Texas A&M University. While at UW–Madison, his book The Dynamics of Performance Management: Constructing Information and Reform was named best book by the Academy of Management's Public and Nonprofit Division and received the Herbert Simon award from the American Political Science Association.

Early life and education
Moynihan completed his Bachelor of Arts degree in public administration at the University of Limerick (1997) and his master's (1998) and Ph.D. (2002) in public administration from the Maxwell School of Citizenship and Public Affairs at Syracuse University.

Career
Upon completing his formal education, Moynihan became an assistant professor at the Bush School of Government and Public Service at Texas A&M University from 2003 until 2005. While there, he received the 2004 Paul Volcker Endowment Junior Scholar Research Grant from the American Political Science Association‘s Public Administration Section for his work "What Do We Talk About When We Talk About Performance? A Content Analysis of Legislative Discussion of Performance Information." Following this, he accepted a similar position at the Robert M. La Follette School of Public Affairs within the University of Wisconsin–Madison.

During his early years at UW–Madison, Moynihan published various books including The Dynamics of Performance Management: Constructing Information and Reform, which won the Best Book Award from the Public and Nonprofit Division of the Academy of Management. It also received the Herbert Simon award from the American Political Science Association, which honors the book with the most significant influence in public administration scholarship in the last three to five years. In the same year, Moynihan launched the Performance Information Project "to bring together contemporary empirical research on how public services use performance data." He was also one of four faculty members chosen to establish a partnership between the Department of Political Science and the Elections Division of the state's Government Accountability Board. As a result of his academic achievements, Moynihan was one of the youngest members elected to be a Fellow of the United States National Academy of Public Administration and served as a member of the Policy Council of the Association for Public Policy Analysis and Management.

By 2014, Moynihan's work was recognized as being among the most influential to be published by the journal Public Administration Review. His works were The Role of Organizations in Fostering Public Service Motivation and Pulling the Levers: Transformational Leadership, Public Service Motivation, and Mission Valence. He was later appointed the La Follette School's Jerry and Mary Cotter Faculty Fellow and received the David N. Kershaw Award from the Association for Public Policy Analysis and Management.

Prior to the 2016 United States presidential election, Moynihan co-authored a paper titled Election Laws, Mobilization, and Turnout: The Unintended Consequences of Electoral Reform, which focused on the effects of election laws to make voting more convenient and increase turnout. The paper won the State Politics and Policy Best Journal Article Award from the American Political Science Association. His research on federal agencies' use of performance management data was referenced in President Barack Obama's proposed U.S. budget for 2016 and 2017. After presenting his research on public sector performance to policymakers at the U.S. Office of Management and Budget, the World Bank and the Organisation for Economic Co-operation and Development (OECD), he received the Leon D. Epstein Distinguished Faculty Research Award from the University of Wisconsin–Madison's College of Letters & Science.

Moynihan left UW–Madison in 2018 to join the faculty of Georgetown University with his wife Pamela Herd as the inaugural McCourt Chair at the McCourt School of Public Policy. From 2018 until 2020, Moynihan was a Visiting Professor at the Blavatnik School of Government and an academic visitor at Nuffield College, Oxford.

References

External links
 

Living people
Alumni of the University of Limerick
Syracuse University alumni
University of Wisconsin–Madison faculty
Texas A&M University faculty
McCourt School of Public Policy faculty
Fellows of the United States National Academy of Public Administration
American political scientists
Irish political scientists
Year of birth missing (living people)